Jean-Baptiste Kiéthéga is an archeologist and historian from Upper Volta, currently Burkina Faso. Kiéthéga was born on May 10, 1947, in Yako.

He is considered to be one of the first archeologists of West Africa. In course of his career, he was honored with a Prince Claus Award yet in 1998 for his progressions in archeology. At that time he had trained around 40 young scholars in this field, and has taken care that his research was made public in the academic world, as well as to the public via for instance museums.

According to Kiéthéga archaeological research in a developing country like Burkina Faso should not be seen as luxury. He views culture as a dynamic concept.

Since 2005 he is a professor at the University of Ouagadougou.

Bibliography 
1980: L'exploitation traditionelle de l'or sur la rive gauche de la Volta noire : (region de poura - Haute-Volta), with Jean Devisse
1983: L'or de la Volta noire: archéologie et histoire de l'exploitation traditionnelle, région de Poura, Haute-Volta, later reprinted
1989: La Recherche archeologique au Burkina Faso
1993: Découverte du Burkina Faso (Annales des conférences organisées par le Centre culturel français Georges Méliès de Ouagadougou, 1991-1992), 
1993: État des recherches sur la production traditionnelle du fer au Burkina Faso
2008: La métallurgie lourde du fer au Burkina Faso: une technologie a l' epoque pre-coloniale. Karthala, Paris,

References 

Burkinabé historians
Burkinabé scientists
Living people
1947 births
People from Nord Region (Burkina Faso)
Academic staff of the University of Ouagadougou
Burkinabé archaeologists
21st-century Burkinabé people